Zoe Mayer (born 7 August 1995) is a German engineer and politician of Alliance 90/The Greens who has been a member of the Bundestag, the parliament of Germany, since the 2021 German federal election. She was directly elected as member of parliament for Karlsruhe-Stadt.

Early life and education
Mayer graduated with a master's degree in engineering management from Karlsruhe Institute of Technology in 2019 and has since been working on a PhD thesis about climate protection in the building sector.

Political career

Career in local politics
Before being elected to the Bundestag, Mayer served as head of her party's group in Karlsruhe city council, where she was first elected in 2014.

Member of the German Parliament, 2021–present
In parliament, Mayer has been serving on the Committee on Food and Agriculture.

In addition to her committee assignments, Mayer has been one of the founding members of a cross-party group promoting a One Health approach since 2022.

References 

1995 births
Members of the Bundestag 2021–2025
Alliance 90/The Greens politicians
Politicians from Karlsruhe
Living people